The fivestripe wrasse (Thalassoma quinquevittatum), also known as the red-ribbon wrasse, is a species of marine ray-finned fish, a wrasse, from the family Labridae. It is found in the Indo-Pacific region.

Etymology
The genus name derives from the Greek thalassa meaning sea and soma meaning body. The Latin species name quinquevittatum means "five stripes".

Description
Thalassoma quinquevittatum can reach  in total length. 
These colorful reef fishes have a complex and quite variable color pattern. The basic color of the body is green with longitudinal red or purple stripes, while the head shows various curved purplish lines and spots. Males change their color during courtship and while they defend their territory. These fishes sometimes interbreed with Thalassoma duperrey. The fivestripe wrasse can be found in the aquarium trade.

Distribution
This species is native to the Indian Ocean and the western Pacific Ocean.

Habitat
It seems to particularly like areas with surge channels, plentiful algal growth, and Acropora coral plates.

Bibliography 
 Eschmeyer, William N., ed. 1998. Catalog of Fishes. Special Publication of the Center for Biodiversity Research and Information, n. 1, vol. 1–3. California Academy of Sciences. San Francisco, California, United States. 2905. .
 Fenner, Robert M.: The Conscientious Marine Aquarist. Neptune City, New Jersey, : T.F.H. Publications, 2001.
 Helfman, G., B. Collette y D. Facey: The diversity of fishes. Blackwell Science, Malden, Massachusetts, 1997.
 Hoese, D.F. 1986: . A M.M. Smith y P.C. Heemstra (eds.) Smiths' sea fishes. Springer-Verlag, Berlín
 Maugé, L.A. 1986.  A J. Daget, J.-P. Gosse y D.F.E. Thys van den Audenaerde (eds.) Check-list of the freshwater fishes of Africa (CLOFFA).
 Moyle, P. y J. Cech.: Fishes: An Introduction to Ichthyology, 4th. Ed., Upper Saddle River, New Jersey, United States: Prentice-Hall. 
 Nelson, J.: Fishes of the World, 3rd. ed. New York: John Wiley and Sons. 1994.
 Wheeler, A.: The World Encyclopedia of Fishes, 2nd. Ed, London: Macdonald. year 1985.

References

External links
 

Thalassoma
Fish of Hawaii
Fish described in 1839
Labridae